Géant Casino is a hypermarket chain based in Saint-Étienne, France, part of the French retailing giant Groupe Casino.

As of February 2016, it had 120 stores in France.

History

Géant opened its first hypermarket in 1970. In Dec 2015, Géant Casino had about 142 hypermarkets all over the world. The concept is, like most hypermarkets, to have all kinds of items available under one roof. A loyalty card system has been introduced by Géant, with a price discount on certain groceries. There are over two million Géant card-holders.

Géant Casino is the fifth largest hypermarket chain in the world and the fourth largest in France after Carrefour, E.Leclerc and Auchan.

Géant in different parts of the world

Operations in the Middle East

Kuwait, Bahrain and UAE
Fu-Com joined with Groupe Casino to bring the Géant hypermarket brand to the Middle East where Géant opened its first store in Bahrain in May 2001. A store was opened in Dubai in 2005 and one in Abu Dhabi in 2015 at Yas Mall. Géant expanded its operations to Kuwait by opening a store in 2005 in Kuwait City.

Acquisition by Majid Al Futtaim Group

In 2017, Dubai-based Majid Al Futtaim Group bought 26 Geant hypermarkets in the UAE, Bahrain and Kuwait by acquiring the Geant franchise owner Retail Arabia from BMA International for an undisclosed amount. The acquired stores were rebranded as Carrefour and Carrefour Market depending on their store format or size.

Qatar 
In Qatar, Groupe Casino joined with local supermarket chain Al Meera to open a hypermarket in Hyatt Plaza, and to sell Casino products in Al Meera stores.

Egypt 
In Egypt, there is now a Géant supermarket in New Cairo.

Countries where Géant is currently not operating
 Lebanon: Géant had one hypermarket in Lebanon which was bought in late 2008 by Sultan Trading Center and replaced by The Sultan Center to be replaced by carrefour  in 2017 upon its closure in Lebanon
 Poland: Géant had nineteen hypermarkets in Poland, which were sold in late 2007 and early 2008 to the German company Metro AG and replaced with Real.
 Taiwan: Géant had several hypermarket locations in Taiwan in a joint venture with a Taiwanese company. After Géant pulled out of the country, the existing hypermarkets were renamed a.mart.
 Saudi Arabia: Géant operated several hypermarkets in the kingdom until 2009 when it was sold to the rival Hyper Panda by the local franchisee partner of Géant France.
 Kuwait, Bahrain and United Arab Emirates: Géant easy Supermarkets and Hypermarkets currently does not operate in Kuwait, Bahrain and UAE. Géant, through a local franchisee partner operated 26 Géant stores across Kuwait, Bahrain and UAE. The chain was acquired by Majid Al Futtaim Group operated Carrefour in 2017 and all the 26 acquired stores in these countries were rebranded as Carrefour for its hypermarket branches and Carrefour Market for its supermarket branches.

Visual history

See also
 List of hypermarkets

References

External links 
 Géant Casino France
 Géant Casino Martinique
 Géant Bahrain
 Géant Dubai-UAE
 Géant Kuwait
 Géant Saudi Arabia
 Géant Tunisia
 Géant Uruguay
 Panda And HyperPanda

Groupe Casino
Hypermarkets of France
Retail companies established in 1970
Companies based in Auvergne-Rhône-Alpes
1970 establishments in France
French brands